Mount Silverheels is a high and prominent mountain summit in the Front Range of the Rocky Mountains of North America.

Mount Silverheels is just east of two fourteeners: Mount Bross and Mount Lincoln.

See also

List of mountain peaks of North America
List of mountain peaks of the United States
List of mountain peaks of Colorado

References

External links

 "Mount Silverheels Trip Report" - at Mountainouswords.com

Silverheels
Silverheels
Pike National Forest
Silverheels
American folklore